Hangin' with Heaven and Hell is a video by heavy metal band Black Sabbath. The video features an interview with Ronnie James Dio, Tony Iommi and Geezer Butler by Eddie Trunk discussing the band's 2007 tour under the name Heaven & Hell. It was filmed in November 2006. It aired on VH1 Classic during March and April 2007. The show was released on DVD through Rhino to coincide with the release of Black Sabbath: The Dio Years.

References

Black Sabbath video albums
2007 video albums
Documentary films about heavy metal music and musicians
Rhino Entertainment video albums